Out of Tune is the second album by Mojave 3, released in 1998.

Critical reception
Rolling Stone called the album "stunning" and "an unerring collection of floating, giant little moments." The Washington City Paper wrote that the album "showcases [Neil] Halstead’s considerable songwriting talent." The A.V. Club praised the band's "subtle and simple, yet surprisingly full-sounding, instrumentation, which includes doses of organ, horns, and pedal-steel guitar."

Track listing

Personnel

Band members
Neil Halstead - vocals, guitar
Rachel Goswell - bass, backing vocals
Ian McCutcheon - Drums, Tambourine, Shaker 
Simon Rowe - electric guitar

Other musicians
B.J. Cole - pedal steel guitar on 2 and 8
Alan Forrester - organ, piano
Roman Breslin - trombone on 1 and 3
Mick Cooke - trumpet on 1 and 3
Lisa Millett - vocals on 6

References

2000 albums
Mojave 3 albums
4AD albums